The 1927 Iowa State Teachers football team represented Iowa State Teachers College (later renamed University of Northern Iowa) as a member of the Iowa Conference during the 1927 college football season. In its third season under head coach Paul F. Bender, the team compiled a 7–0–1 record and won the Iowa Conference championship.

Schedule

References

Iowa State Teachers
Northern Iowa Panthers football seasons
College football undefeated seasons
Iowa State Teachers football